P. trifoliata  may refer to:
 Poncirus trifoliata, the trifoliate orange, a tree species native to northern China and Korea
 Ptelea trifoliata, the hoptree or wafer ash, a deciduous shrub or small tree species native to North America